Tony Daniel (born November 25, 1963) is an American science fiction writer and was an editor at Baen Books before becoming a senior editor at Regnery Publishing.

Career
Tony Daniel was born on November 25, 1963, in Tuscaloosa, Alabama.

Daniel began writing science fiction in 1990. He has authored eight books, numerous short stories and poems, as well as literary criticism and reviews. His work has appeared numerous times in Gardner Dozois' The Year's Best Science Fiction anthologies. Daniel was a senior  editor at Baen Books.  He was also senior story editor at scifi.com's Seeing Ear Theater from 2000 to 2002, where he wrote, produced and directed several productions.  He was a lecturer in science fiction as literature, screenplays, and graduate writing workshops at the University of Texas at Dallas from 2006 to 2011. He is currently a senior editor at Regnery Publishing.

In Warpath (1993), his first novel, Indigenous people of North America discover how to travel in space. Publishers Weekly gave the work a mixed review, stating "An original premise, interesting characters and stylish writing distinguish this first novel, but they are buried under a mountain of pseudo-mystical philosophy and fuzzy science. ... Daniel's effort, despite his evident talent, leaves important details unfortunately vague." Kirkus Reviews wrote "Fizzing with ideas (not all convincing), gloriously diverse, bizarrely uncontrolled: Daniel has plenty of work still to do, but his debut holds forth immense promise."

The novels Metaplanetary (2001) and Superluminal (2004) are part of a trilogy, based on the novella Grist; its third installment has yet to appear in print. The Metaplanetary trilogy is a space opera about a war between two parts of the Solar System. Of Metaplanetary, the Publishers Weekly review stated "Keeping any moralizing tendencies nicely in check, Daniel seems to want to create an epic vision of humanity. If he can finish the story with the intelligence and energy he shows here, he may achieve that goal." Kirkus Reviews held a similar view, writing "Vast, intricate, fizzing with wit, and bulging with utterly fascinating ideas; nonetheless, without even a token ending, this is only the first installment of a series ... Awesome, thrilling, spellbinding, and infuriating in equal measure."

His short story "Life on the Moon" was a finalist for the Hugo Award for Best Short Story in 1996 and won the Asimov's Magazine Reader's Choice Award for that year.

Bibliography

Novels
 Warpath (Tor, 1993)  
 Earthling (Tor, 1997) 
 Metaplanetary (Eos, 2001) 
 Superluminal (Eos, 2004) 
 Guardian of Night (Baen, 2012) 
 The Heretic (with David Drake) (Baen, 2013) 
 Star Trek the Original Series: Devil's Bargain (Pocket Books, 2013) 
 The Savior (with David Drake) (Baen, 2014) 
 Star Trek the Original Series: Savage Trade (Pocket Books, 2015) 
 The Dragon Hammer, Wulf's Saga Book 1 (Baen Books, 2016) 
 The Amber Arrow, Wulf's Saga Book 2 (Baen Books, 2017)

Short story collections
 The Robot's Twilight Companion (Golden Gryphon Press, 1999)

Novellas
 "Candle", Asimov's Science Fiction (Dell Magazines, June 1991)
 "Death of Reason", Asimov's Science Fiction (Dell Magazines, Sept. 1992)
 "A Dry, Quiet War" (1996)
 "The Robot's Twilight Companion", Asimov's Science Fiction (Dell Magazines, Aug. 1996) 
 "Grist", Asimov's Science Fiction (Dell Magazines, Dec. 1998) 
 "Lovers" (2017)

Short fiction
 "The Passage of Night Trains" (1990)
 "Words" (1991)
 "Candle" (1991)
 "Prism Tree" (1991)
 "Locust" (1991)
 "Brothers" (1991)
 "The Natural Hack" (1992)
 "Lost in Transmission" (1992)
 "Faces" (1992)
 "Despair, Not Feast on Thee" (1992)
 "The Careful Man Goes West" (1992)
 "Death of Reason" (1992)
 "Sun So Hot I Froze to Death" (1993)
 "Always Falling Apart" (1993)
 "Aconcagua" (1993)
 "Dover Beach" (1993)
 "God's Foot" (1993)
 "Angel of Mercy" (1994)
 "Press Return" (1995)
 "Life on the Moon" (1995)
 "No Love in All of Dwingeloo" (1995)
 "The Joys of the Sidereal Long Distance Runner" (1996)
 "The Robot's Twilight Companion" (1996)
 "The Ashes of New Orleans" (1997)
 "Black Canoes" (1997)
 "Radio Praha" (1998)
 "Mystery Box" (1999)
 "In From the Commons" (1999)
 "Barry Malzberg Drives a Black Cadillac" (2001)
 "The Valley of the Gardens" (2007)
 "Ex Cathedra" (2008)
 "CHECKSUM Checkmate" (2012)
 "The Heretic" (excerpt) (2013) with David Drake
 "Frog Water" (2013)
 "And to All a Good Night" (2013)
 "Hell Hounds" (2015)
 "The Powhatan" (2017)

References

External links
 
 Tony Daniel on Fantastic Fiction
 
 A Seeing Ear Theatre production archive

1963 births
Living people
American male novelists
American science fiction writers
American speculative fiction editors
Baen Books